Operation Grandma (Mivtza Savta) is a short 1999 Israeli satirical comedy about the military and kibbutz life directed by Dror Shaul.  It was filmed on Kibbutz Yakum and based on the funeral of Esther Shaul (sister of Israel Galili). Esther was Dror's grandmother who was buried in Kibbutz Kissufim where Shaul was born and raised.

Plot
Three very different brothers – Alon (34), a no-nonsense Israeli Army officer; Benni (30), a brilliant electrician; and Idan (22), a wimpy field trip guide – navigate obstacles in an attempt to bury their beloved grandmother in the cemetery of her kibbutz, the fictional Asisim. Because Alon has a secret security operation set for that same day, they have to work on a tight schedule, so he plans it like a military operation (hence the title). A series of mistakes and mishaps complicate things.

Cast 
Rami Heuberger as Alon "Krembo" Sagiv
Ami Smolartchik as Benni Sagiv
Tzach Spitzen as Idan Sagiv
Einat Weitzman as Hagit
Rozina Cambos as Deborah
Hugo Yarden as Sergio
Danielle Miller as Christine
Pablo Salzman as Claudio
Gabriel Troisgros as Patrick
Davida Karol as Haya Sagiv
Eyal Rozales as Gabby
Rotem Abuhab as Shirly
Efron Etkin as Meir Cohen

Critical reception
The film won a 2000 Ophir Award in the television drama category. Haaretz called it "one of the most successful Israeli comedies ever seen on the small screen", and the film has achieved cult film status in that country.

References

External links

1999 films
Israeli comedy films
1990s Hebrew-language films
Films about the kibbutz
Military humor in film
Films about the Israel Defense Forces
Israeli satirical films
1990s satirical films
Films about brothers
1999 comedy films